The 2016–17 Polish Cup was the sixty-third season of the annual Polish football knockout tournament. It began on 16 July 2016 with the first matches of the Preliminary Round and ended on 2 May 2017 with the Final at PGE Narodowy. Winners of the competition will qualify for the qualifying tournament of the 2017–18 UEFA Europa League.

Participating teams

Source: 90minut.pl
Notes
 Zawisza did not receive a license for the 2016–17 season and withdrew from the competition.
 Dolcan dissolved during the 2015–16 season.
 Okocimski dissolved during the 2015–16 season.
 Nadwiślan withdrew from the competition.

Round and draw dates 

Source: 90minut.pl

Preliminary round 
The draw for this round was conducted at the headquarters of the Polish FA on 24 June 2016. Participating in this round were 16 regional cup winners, 18 teams from the 2015–16 II liga and 6 lowest ranked teams from the 2015–16 I liga. The matches were played on 15-17 July 2016.

16 of the 24 I liga and II liga teams participating in the preliminary round were drawn against the 16 regional cup winners, and the remaining 8 were drawn against each other. Games were hosted by teams playing in the lower division in the 2016–17 season. The hosts of Odra Opole vs. Siarka Tarnobrzeg and Radomiak Radom vs. Stal Stalowa Wola (all teams playing in 2016–17 II liga) games was determined by the order in which the teams were drawn.
The number in brackets indicates what tier of Polish football each team competes in during the 2016–17 season.

! colspan="3" style="background:cornsilk;"|15 July 2016

|-
! colspan="3" style="background:cornsilk;"|16 July 2016

|-
! colspan="3" style="background:cornsilk;"|17 July 2016

|-
! colspan="3" style="background:cornsilk;"|No match
|-
|style="text-align:right; background:#d0f0c0;"| Rominta Gołdap (5) 
|style="text-align:center; " colspan=2 rowspan=2|bye to the next round
|-
|style="text-align:right; background:#d0f0c0;"| KSZO Ostrowiec Świętokrzyski (4) 
|-

|}
Notes
Note 1: Nadwiślan Góra withdrew from the competition.

First round 
The draw for this round was conducted at the headquarters of the Polish FA on 24 June 2016. The matches will be played on 22–27 July 2016. Participating in this round will the 20 winners from the previous round and 12 highest ranked teams from the 2015–16 I liga.
Winners of match 2 will advance to the next round. The 12 teams joining in this round were seeded and their opponents were drawn from the 20 winners of the preliminary round (the other 6 formed the remaining 3 matches). Games will be hosted by teams playing in the lower division in the 2016–17 season. Hosts of matches between teams playing in the same tier will be decided by a draw.
The number in brackets indicates what tier of Polish football each team competes in during the 2016–17 season.

! colspan="3" style="background:cornsilk;"|22 July 2016

|-
! colspan="3" style="background:cornsilk;"|23 July 2016

|-
! colspan="3" style="background:cornsilk;"|26 July 2016

|-
! colspan="3" style="background:cornsilk;"|27 July 2016

|-
! colspan="3" style="background:cornsilk;"|No match
|-
|style="text-align:right; background:#d0f0c0;"| GKS Jastrzębie (4) 
|style="text-align:center " colspan="2"|bye to the next round
|}

Bracket

Round of 32 
The draw for this round was conducted at the PGE Narodowy on 25 July 2016. The matches were played from 9 to 24 August 2016. Participating in this round were the 16 winners from the previous round and 16 teams from the 2015–16 Ekstraklasa. Games were hosted by teams playing in the lower division in the 2016–17 season. The hosts of matches of teams playing in the same tier were the teams occupying a higher position in the bracket.

! colspan="3" style="background:cornsilk;"|9 August 2016

|-
! colspan="3" style="background:cornsilk;"|10 August 2016

|-
! colspan="3" style="background:cornsilk;"|11 August 2016

|-
! colspan="3" style="background:cornsilk;"|24 August 2016

|}

Round of 16 
Competing in this round will the 16 winners from the previous round. The draw for this round was conducted at PGE Narodowy, Warsaw on 25 July 2016. Matches will be played on 20–28 September 2016. Hosts of matches between teams playing in the same tier were decided by a draw conducted on 12 August 2016.

! colspan="3" style="background:cornsilk;"|20 September 2016

|-
! colspan="3" style="background:cornsilk;"|21 September 2016

|-
! colspan="3" style="background:cornsilk;"|22 September 2016

|-
! colspan="3" style="background:cornsilk;"|27 September 2016

|-
! colspan="3" style="background:cornsilk;"|28 September 2016

|}

Quarter-finals
The 8 winners from Round of 16 will compete in this round. The matches will be played in two legs. The first leg took place on 25–26 October 2016. The second leg took place on 29–30 November 2016. The draw for this round was conducted at PGE Narodowy, Warsaw on 25 July 2016. Host of first match between teams playing in the same tier were decided by a draw conducted on 29 September 2016.

|}

First leg

Second leg

Semi-finals
The 4 winners from Quarterfinals will compete in this round. The matches will be played in two legs. The first legs took place on 28 February and 1 March 2017. The second legs took place on 4–5 April 2017. The draw for this round was conducted at Stadion Miejski im. Henryka Reymana, Kraków on 30 November 2016.

|}

First leg

Second leg

Final
The final match was played at the PGE Narodowy, Warsaw on 2 May 2017. Host of the final match was decided by a draw conducted on 10 April 2017.

Top goalscorers

See also
 2016–17 Ekstraklasa
 2016–17 I liga

Notes

References

Polish Cup
Cup
Polish Cup seasons